Cronstedt is a surname. Notable people with the surname include:

Axel Fredrik Cronstedt, Swedish chemist 
Carl Olof Cronstedt, Swedish naval commander
Carl Johan Cronstedt, Swedish architect, inventor, Earl, noble, civil servant, scientist and bibliophile
Claes Cronstedt, Swedish corporate lawyer
Dagmar Cronstedt (1919–2006), Swedish countess and radio personality
Johan Adam Cronstedt, Swedish general